Aurora Gory Alice is the first studio album by Letters to Cleo. It was released in 1993 on CherryDisc Records and re-released in 1994 on Giant Records. The first single from the album was "I See," which got little exposure (although it was later used as the music that plays during the closing credits of Daria episode "Through a Lens Darkly"). However, the second single, "Here & Now", received much exposure when it was featured on the Melrose Place soundtrack a year later.

The re-released version of the album contains different versions of "Rim Shak" and "Here & Now" than the original release. The difference between the two versions was that the second version had Scott Riebling playing bass, while the first release featured Brian Karp, who originally played bass and wrote music for the band. A demo version of "I See" is available on the 1998 release Sister.

Critical reception
Trouser Press wrote that "the record’s airy sonics, Kay Hanley’s soaring vocals and the band’s smart pop-rock songwriting make for a solid, if not especially challenging, effort."

Track listing
All songs by Letters to Cleo

 "Big Star" - 4:05
 "I See" - 3:49
 "Rim Shak" - 6:01
 "Wasted" - 4:24
 "Get on With It" - 4:17
 "Here & Now" - 3:38
 "From Under the Dust" - 3:26
 "Mellie's Comin' Over" - 2:12
 "Come Around" - 4:11
 "Step Back" - 2:35

Chart positions

Album
1995   Aurora Gory Alice   The Billboard 200   No. 123
1995   Aurora Gory Alice   Heatseekers         No. 3

Singles
1995   Here & Now   The Billboard Hot 100   No. 56
1995   Here & Now   Modern Rock Tracks      No. 10

Credits 
Chris Gorman - Photography
Letters to Cleo - Photography
Mike Denneen - Producer, Mixing
Henk Kooistra - Mastering
Michael Eisenstein - Guitar, Keyboards, Backing Vocals
Kay Hanley - Guitar, Lead Vocals
Stacy Jones - Drums
Greg McKenna - Guitar, Backing Vocals
Scott Riebling	 - Bass, Backing Vocals
Antonio Oliart Ros - Mastering
John Egan - Graphic Design
Jeff Kellem - Photography
Rose LeBeau - 	Photography, cover photo
Pam Berry - Photography
Eric Antoniou - Photography
Brian Karp - Bass

See also
1993 in music

References

1993 debut albums
Letters to Cleo albums